Maroc Agence Presse (known as MAP) is the Moroccan state-owned official news agency.

History and profile
The agency was founded on 31 May 1959 by Mehdi Bennouna in Rabat. It was nationalized in 1973.

The director is Mohammed Khabbachi, and headquartered in Rabat. The agency has official international services in five languages: Arabic, English, French, Spanish, and Tamazight. In 1960, the agency launched the African bulletin. It launched the Middle East service as well as the English service on 14 October 1975.

Abdeljalil Fenjiro served as the director of the agency for more than twenty years until 16 November 1999 when Mohammed Yassine Mansouri replaced him in the post.

In addition to providing news, the agency cofounded a national charter for the improvement of women's images in the media with the ministry of social development and 
family and solidarity and the ministry of communication and culture in 2005.

International offices
The agency has international offices in Abidjan, Algiers, Bonn, Beyrouth, Cairo, Dakar, Geneva, Jeddah, Lisbon, Madrid, Mexico City, Montreal, Moscow, New Delhi, Nouakchott, Paris, Rome, Tunis and Washington. In addition, the agency has a large network in Asia.

National and regional offices
The agency has national and regional offices in Agadir, Casablanca, Tangier, Dakhla, Fez, Kenitra, Laayoune, Nador, Oujda and Settat.

Correspondents
The agency has correspondents in Abu Dhabi, Addis Ababa, Ankara, Baghdad, Buenos Aires, Beijing, Caracas, Damascus, El Jadida, Essaouira, Málaga, Marseille, Mexico City, New Delhi, Ouarzazate, Pretoria, Tan-Tan, Taza, Tehran, Tétouan and Tripoli.

See also
Media of Morocco
 Federation of Arab News Agencies (FANA)

References

External links
Official website

1959 establishments in Morocco
Government agencies established in 1959
News agencies based in Morocco
Arab news agencies
Mass media in Rabat